Estadio Brígido Iriarte is a multi-purpose stadium in Caracas, Venezuela.  It is currently used mostly for football matches and is the home stadium of Venezuelan Primera División team Atlético Venezuela, as well as second-tier league team Estudiantes de Caracas. The stadium currently holds 10,000 people.

It was completely renovated in 2007.

References
https://cityseeker.com/caracas/1140985-br%C3%ADgido-iriarte-stadium

1983 establishments in Venezuela
Sports venues in Caracas
Sports venues completed in 1983
Brígido Iriarte Stadium
Brígido Iriarte Stadium
Multi-purpose stadiums in Venezuela